Tikamgarh district is one of the 52 districts of Madhya Pradesh state in central India. Tikamgarh town is the district headquarters. The district is part of Sagar Division.

It is bounded on the east and southeast by Chhatarpur District of Madhya Pradesh, and by the Uttar Pradesh districts of Lalitpur on the west and Niwari District on the north.

Origin of name
The district is named after its headquarters, Tikamgarh. The original name of the town was Tihri. In 1783, the ruler of Orchha Vikramajit (1776–1817) shifted his capital from Orchha to Tihri and renamed it Tikamgarh (Tikam is one of the names of Krishna).

History
The area covered by this district was part of the Princely State of Orchha till its merger with the Indian Union. The Orchha state was founded by Rudra Pratap Singh in 1501. After merger, it became one of the eight districts of Vindhya Pradesh state in 1948. Following the reorganization of states on 1 November 1956 it became a district of the newly carved Madhya Pradesh

Orchha was founded some times after 1501 AD, by the Bundela chief, Rudra Pratap Singh, who became the first King of Orchha, (r. 1501–1531) and also built the Fort of Orchha. He died in an attempt to save a cow from a lion. The Chaturbhuj Temple was built, during the time of Akbar, by the Queen of Orchha, while Raj Mandir was built by 'Madhukar Shah' during his reign, 1554 to 1591.

During the rule of Mughal Emperor, Jahangir, his ally, Vir Singh Deo (r. 1605–1627) reigned here, and it was during this period that Orchha reaches its height, and many extant palaces are a reminder of its architectural glory, including Jahangir Mahal (born c. 1605) and Sawan Bhadon Mahal.

In the early 17th century, Raja Jhujhar Singh rebelled against the Mughal emperor Shah Jahan, whose armies devastated the state and occupied Orchha from 1635 to 1641. Orchha and Datia were the only Bundela states not subjugated by the Marathas in the 18th century.

Hamir Singh, who ruled from 1848 to 1874, was elevated to the style of Maharaja in 1865. Maharaja Pratap Singh (born 1854, died 1930), who succeeded to the throne in 1874, devoted himself entirely to the development of his state, himself designing most of the engineering and irrigation works that were executed during his reign.

It was the oldest and highest in rank of all the Bundela states, with a 17-gun salute, and its Maharajas bore the hereditary title of First of the Prince of Bundelkhand. Vir Singh, Pratap Singh's successor, merged his state with the Union of India on January 1, 1950. The district became part of Vindhya Pradesh state, which was merged into Madhya Pradesh state in 1956. Today Orchha is almost a nondescript town with a small population, and its importance is maintained only due to its rich architectural heritage and tourism.

Books on the rich history of Orchha are available in local shops, mostly in the Hindi language. Only a thorough reading of some of this material will tell about the rich and varied history of this place.

Economy
In 2006 the Ministry of Panchayati Raj named Tikamgarh one of the country's 250 most backward districts (out of a total of 640). It is one of the 24 districts in Madhya Pradesh receiving funds from the Backward Regions Grant Fund Programme (BRGF). The economy of this area mainly based on agriculture and allied activities.

Tikamgarh is a major player in producing pyrophyllite. There are various pyrophyllite mining sites where high-quality pyrophyllite stone is getting mined. The pyrophyllite of Tikamgarh is getting exported to all over India.

Demographics
Tikamgarh district of Madhya Pradesh has a total population of 1,445,166 as per the Census 2011. Out of which 760,355 are males while 684,811 are females. In 2011 there were total of 296,116 families residing in Tikamgarh district. The Average Sex Ratio of Tikamgarh district is 901.

As per Census 2011 out of the total population, 17.3% of people live in Urban areas while 82.7% live in the rural areas. The average literacy rate in urban areas is 74.7% while that in the rural areas is 58.6%. Also, the Sex Ratio of Urban areas in Tikamgarh district is 909 while that of Rural areas is 899. The population of Children age 0–6 years in Tikamgarh district is 227564 which is 16% of the total population. There are 120303 male children and 107261 female children between the ages of 0–6 years. Thus as per the Census 2011, the Child Sex Ratio of Tikamgarh is 892 which is less than the Average Sex Ratio (901) of Tikamgarh district. The total literacy rate of Tikamgarh district is 61.43%. The male literacy rate is 60.41% and the female literacy rate is 42.14% in Tikamgarh district.

The bifurcated district had a population of 1,040,359, of which 170,655 (16.40%) lived in urban areas. Tikamgarh had a sex ratio of 901 females per 1000 males. Schedule Castes and Scheduled Tribes make up 262,163 (25.20%) and 49,613 (4.77%) of the population respectively.

Hindus are 987,048 (94.88%) of the population while Muslims are 37,864 (3.64%) of the population. Jains are 13,953 (1.34%) of the population.

Languages 

At the time of the 2011 census, 84.94% of the population spoke Bundeli and 14.61% Hindi as their first language.

Festivals
Moniya Dance in Bundelkhand is performed every year during the festival of light Diwali/Deepawali at the end of October or the first week of November according to the lunar calendar. In this connection, the epic story goes that “in Gokul” when Lord Krishna raised Govardhan Mountain on his finger to save his associates (milkmen), they danced in joy. The main instruments used in this dance are ‘Dholak’ and ‘Nagaria’ (both being a form of drums). The male dancers with long sticks show the martial arts when the beats of drums inspire their energy and emotions. This dance is also performed as a ‘thanksgiving’ after harvesting.
The dancers wear multi-colored apparel and the chief dancer holds the peacock feathers in his hands and the rest stick those feathers in their half pants.

Cuisines
Tikamgarh is famous for mawa filled ras bhariya gujiyas. You have drooled over the tempting gujiyas on every occasion, especially on Holi. With an extra dose of sweetness and flavors, this Chashni wali gujiya is pure bliss and a great hit amongst everyone.

Hospital facilities

Rajendra Prasad District Hospital 
Govt. Ayurvedic Dispensary
Ayush Wing – District Hospital
Life line Nursing Home
Sudha Sevalaya Nursing Home

Education

Schools
Government Excellence Higher Secondary School, Tikamgarh
Government Excellence Higher Secondary School, Jatara
Government Excellence Higher Secondary School, Palera
Government Higher Secondary School, Tikamgarh, No-2
Jawahar Navodaya Vidhyalaya Tikamgarh
Kendriya Vidyalaya Tikamgarh
Model Higher Secondary School, Tikamgarh
Pushpa High School Tikamgarh
Saroj Convent Higher Secondary School Tikamgarh
Unique Educational Academy School Tikamgarh

Colleges / universities
College of Agriculture, Tikamgarh
District Institute of Education and Training, Kundeshwar
Govt Law College Tikamgarh
Govt P G College Tikamgarh
Govt College, Lidhoura
Govt College, Mohangarh
Govt College, Lidhoura
Govt Virangana Avanti Bai Girls College, Tikamgarh
ITI-Tikamgarh, District – Tikamgarh
ITI-Baldeogarh, District – Tikamgarh
Polytechnic College, Tikamgarh
Polytechnic College, Jatara

Communication
Postage stamps of this feudatory state were prepared for use in 1897 but were never issued. First Orchha State stamps were issued in 1913. Separate stamps were discontinued on 30 April 1950 after the state was merged with the Union of India early that year.

Transportation
Tikamgarh has the biggest bus stand in Madhya Pradesh.

Roads
There are daily services of buses for every part of the state.
Highways Passing from Tikamgarh are NH-12A, SH-10.

Apart from it, buses for Delhi, Nagpur, Kanpur are also there.

Railways
Tikamgarh railway station is in the North Central Railway Zone. Its Railway code is TKMG.
The construction of the railway line to Tikamgarh has been completed in 2012. On 26 April 2013 was connected with railway services. The rail services began from Lalitpur(Uttar Pradesh) to Tikamgarh and were started under the Lalitpur-Singrauli Rail Project. The first train to travel between the two stations was Tikamgarh-Jhansi(Uttar Pradesh) passenger train. The train was sanctioned between the two stations in the Rail Budget of 2012–13. The railway line between Tikamgarh and Lalitpur rail routes is 40 kilometers long. Union Minister Pradeep Jain flagged-off the train at Lalitpur station

Airways
Khajuraho is the nearest (114 km) airport from where there is a daily flight for Delhi  & Varanasi. which comes under Chhatarpur District.

Notable tourist spots
There are various places to visit in Tikamgarh. Some places are of historical importance.

Kundeshwar:- An important village situated 5 km. south of Tikamgarh town on the bank of the Jamdar river. This place is famous for kundadev Mahadev temple. It is believed that Shiv Linga has emerged from Kunda. In the south of it, there is a beautiful picnic spot known as ‘Barighar’ and a beautiful waterfall known as ‘Usha Water Fall’.The village possesses Archaeological Museum and Vinobha Sansthan. Maharaja Birsingh deo established the Keshva Sahitya Sansthan which was patronized by Pandit Banarsidas Chaturvedi and Yaspal Jain during their stay at Kundeshwar. Three big fairs held at Kundeshwar annually. An important fair attended by 50,000 persons held in pouse/Magh (January) on the occasion of Sankranti. Second, held on the occasion of Basant Panchami and third held on the Kartik Ekadashi in the month of October/November.
Baldeogarh:- Baldeogarh is one of the tehsils of District Tikamgarh. It is situated on the Tikamgarh-Chhattarpur road at a distance of 26 km from Tikamgarh. The massive rock fort standing above the beautiful tank Gwal-Sagar presents a very pleasing sight. The fort is a very fine specimen of its class and one of the most picturesque in the region. A big old Gun is still placed in this fort. The town is known for its betel-leaf cultivation. The importance of town also lies in its famous temple of ‘Vindhya Vasini Devi’. An annual seven days Vindhyavasani fair is held here in the month of Chaitra and attended by about 10,000 persons.
Paporaji:- It is an old village about 5 km, south-east of Tikamgarh town. It is a famous Jain pilgrimage centre which attracts a large number of Jain devotees. The village contains about 80 old Jain temples. Few Jain temples are under construction. The famous Jain temples of twenty-four Tirthakars is the main attraction of devotees. An important Jain fair, attended by 10,000 persons, held in the month of Kartika sudi Purnima. It is managed by a trust.
Aharji:- A Village of Baldeogarh tehsil Ahar lies on the side of Tikamgarh-Chhattarpur road at a distance of 25 km. from the district headquarters of the district. Regular buses are available to reach this place. It is evidently an old village said to have been populated by Jamalpur Ahars, which was once an important Jain Centre. Several ruins, Old images and temples are located here. The Village contain three old Jain temples one of these temples has an image of Shantinath, having height 20 feet. A tank of Chadella days with a fine dam stands here.
Madkhera:- A small village situated on the North-West of Tikamgarh town at a distance of about 20 km. The importance of this place lies in its famous SUN Temple. Its entrance is from the east. SUN idol is placed here. The other main object of interest of the village is a temple of Vindhya Vasani Devi on the top of the hill.
Badagaon:- famous Jain temple, Hanuman temple, Shiva temple and Dhasan river.

Geography

Rivers and lakes
The Betwa River flows along the northwestern boundary of the district and Dhasan River on the bank of Badagaon, one of its tributaries flows along the eastern boundary of the district. Both of these rivers flow towards the northeast. The tributaries of the Betwa flowing through this district are Jamni, Bagri and Barua. A New District Named Niwari is Proposed to create consisting of 3 Tehsils Orchha, Prithvipur& Niwari Itself.

Divisions
Tikamgarh district is divided into three sub-divisions, which are further divided into seven tehsils. The district consists four development blocks, namely Tikamgarh, Baldeogarh, Jatara and Palera.

There are 3 Madhya Pradesh Vidhan Sabha constituencies in this district: Tikamgarh, Jatara and Khargapur. All of these are part of Tikamgarh Lok Sabha constituency.

Civic administration

References

External links

Tikamgarh District website
Bundelkhand Website

 
Districts of Madhya Pradesh